Erika Bethmann (born 31 August 1939) is a German fencer. She competed in the women's team foil event at the 1972 Summer Olympics.

References

1939 births
Living people
German female fencers
Olympic fencers of West Germany
Fencers at the 1972 Summer Olympics
Sportspeople from Hamburg